Samu Laitinen (born 13 August 1999) is a Finnish professional footballer, who plays as a forward.

Club career

HJK
Laitinen is a product of FC Kontu and later joined HJK Helsinki, where he made his debut for the clubs second team, Klubi 04, in 2016. On 2 February 2017, he got his official debut for HJK in the Finnish Cup at the age of 17 against IF Gnistan.

In 2018, he became a regular starter for Klubi and on 8 September 2018, he also got his Veikkausliiga debut for HJK against FC Inter Turku. He started on the bench, before replacing Riku Riski for the last couple of minutes. Laitinen got his contract further extended for the 2019 season but with only one game four games in the whole 2019 season, he left the club at the end of the year.

KPV
On 4 December 2019 it was confirmed, that Laitinen had joined KPV on a one-year deal. Laitinen made his debut for KPV on 25 January 2020 against AC Oulu in the Finnish Cup.

IF Gnistan
On 5 February 2021, Laitinen moved to fellow league club IF Gnistan on a one-year deal. He made his debut on 13 February 2021 against JIPPO. in the Suomen Cup.

References

External links

1999 births
Living people
Finnish footballers
Finland youth international footballers
Veikkausliiga players
Kakkonen players
Ykkönen players
Klubi 04 players
Helsingin Jalkapalloklubi players
Kokkolan Palloveikot players
IF Gnistan players
Association football defenders
Footballers from Helsinki
21st-century Finnish people